Pempelia cirtensis is a species of snout moth. It is found on Cyprus, Turkey, Israel and North Africa, including Algeria.

References

Moths described in 1890
Phycitini
Insects of Turkey